Kang Hyo-Il (born March 28, 1988) is a South Korean footballer who plays for FC Ganju Iwate in the Japanese Regional Leagues.

References

External links

J. League
Tohoku League: List of goal scorers 2012

1988 births
Living people
Kibi International University alumni
South Korean footballers
J2 League players
Japan Football League players
FC Gifu players
FC Kariya players
Association football forwards
Sportspeople from Gyeonggi Province